The 1912 United States presidential election in Arkansas took place on November 5, 1912, as part of the 1912 United States presidential election. Voters chose nine representatives, or electors, to the Electoral College, who voted for president and vice president.

Arkansas was won by Princeton University President Woodrow Wilson (D–Virginia), running with governor of Indiana Thomas R. Marshall, with 55.01% of the popular vote, against the 27th president of the United States William Howard Taft (R–Ohio), running with Columbia University President Nicholas Murray Butler, with 20.45% of the popular vote, the 26th president of the United States Theodore Roosevelt (P–New York), running with governor of California Hiram Johnson, with 17.30% of the popular vote and the five-time candidate of the Socialist Party of America for President of the United States Eugene V. Debs (S–Indiana), running with the first Socialist mayor of a major city in the United States Emil Seidel, with 6.52% of the popular vote.

Results

Results by county

See also
 United States presidential elections in Arkansas

Notes

References

Arkansas
1912
1912 Arkansas elections